Pilar Vergara (born 23 June 1947) is a Chilean journalist, winner of the National Prize for Journalism in 1993.

Career
Pilar Vergara is the daughter of Ruperto Vergara Santa Cruz, a publicist and farmer from La Calera, and Olga Tagle. She is the granddaughter of distinguished jurist and diplomat Ruperto Vergara Bulnes. She studied at the Pontifical Catholic University of Chile (UC), graduating in 1968.

Subsequently, she worked at Canal 13, on the program Pasado meridiano, and at the newspaper El Mercurio, where she participated in the Sunday Reports section. At that paper, she was also the editor of Section D reports. She was a professor of journalistic techniques at the journalism school of the Catholic University.

Initially, she worked as editor-in-chief, later assuming the position of editor of information services. In 2006, after the appointment of Zegers at El Mercurio, she assumed the position of director of the newspaper, a job she held until 2011.

In 2012, she joined the board of Universidad Mayor.

Vergara currently writes a Sunday column for El Mercurio.

Awards
 1988 – Lenka Franulic Award
 1991 – Embotelladora Andina Award
 1993 – National Prize for Journalism
 2001 – Distinguished Alumna Award from the UC Alumni Association
 2003 – Carmen Puelma Award

References

1947 births
20th-century Chilean women writers
20th-century Chilean non-fiction writers
21st-century Chilean women writers
21st-century Chilean non-fiction writers
Chilean journalists
Chilean women journalists
Living people
Place of birth missing (living people)
Pontifical Catholic University of Chile alumni
Academic staff of the Pontifical Catholic University of Chile
Pilar